Hugo Álvarez Antúnez (born 2 July 2003) is a Spanish professional footballer who plays as a midfielder for Celta de Vigo B.

Club career
Álvarez began playing football with the youth academy of Ourense CF in 2007 at the age of four, and moved to RC Celta de Vigo's academy at under-8 level. He made his professional debut with Celta in a 3–0 La Liga win over Getafe CF on 25 October 2021.

References

External links
 
 
 

2003 births
Living people
Footballers from Ourense
Spanish footballers
RC Celta de Vigo players
Celta de Vigo B players
Association football midfielders
La Liga players
Primera Federación players